Octacílio Pinheiro Guerra (21 November 1909 – 26 February 1967) was a Brazilian football player. He played for Brazil national team.

References

1909 births
1967 deaths
Brazilian footballers
Brazil international footballers
1934 FIFA World Cup players
Botafogo de Futebol e Regatas players
Association football defenders
Footballers from Porto Alegre